The Australosphenida are a clade of mammals, containing mammals with tribosphenic molars, known from the Jurassic to Mid-Cretaceous of Gondwana. They are thought to have acquired their tribosphenic molars independently from those of Tribosphenida. Fossils of australosphenidans have been found from the Jurassic of Madagascar and Argentina, and Cretaceous of Australia and Argentina. Monotremes have also been considered a part of this group in some studies, but this is disputed.

Taxonomy 
This grouping includes the following taxa:

†Henosferidae, including the genera Ambondro, Asfaltomylos, and Henosferus from the Jurassic of Argentina and Madagascar.
†Ausktribosphenidae, including the genera Ausktribosphenos, Bishops from the Lower Cretaceous of Australia and Mid-Cretaceous of Argentina
†Vincelestes, sometimes recovered as an australosphenidan (when not inversely considered a cladotherian).
†Tendagurutherium, also recently recovered as an australosphenidan.

The clade Australosphenida was proposed by Luo et al. (2001, 2002) and was initially left unranked, as the authors do not apply the Linnaean hierarchy. In Benton (2005), it is ranked as a 'superdivision', i.e. one or two levels below the infraclass.

Australosphenid teeth 
The grouping embodies a hypothesis about the evolution of molar teeth in mammals. Living monotremes are toothless as adults, but the juvenile platypus, fossil monotremes and Ausktribosphenida all share a pattern of three molar cusps arranged in a triangle or V shape, which is known as the tribosphenic type of molar. Tribosphenic molars have long been held to characterize the subclass Theria (marsupials, placentals and their extinct relatives), while monotremes were thought to be related to fossil groups with a linear alignment of cusps: morganucodontids, docodonts, triconodonts and multituberculates, all of which were united with the monotremes into the 'subclass Prototheria'. Defined in this way, the 'Prototheria' is no longer recognised as a valid clade, since the linear cusp pattern is a primitive condition within Mammalia and cannot supply the shared derived character, which is required to establish a subgroup. Instead, the available evidence suggests that the monotremes descend from a Mesozoic radiation of tribosphenic mammals in the southern continents (hence the name Australosphenida, meaning 'southern wedges'), but this interpretation is highly controversial.

According to Luo et al., tribosphenic molars were evolved by the Australosphenida independently of the true Tribosphenida, or Boreosphenida (that is, the therians and their relatives) in the northern continents. Others contend that the ausktribosphenids (two families of the Australian Cretaceous tribosphenids) in fact belong to the placentals and were therefore true tribosphenids, but unrelated to the ancestry of the monotremes. Alternatively, Flannery and colleagues argue that the Australian Barremian-Aptian family Bishopidae are stem therians. If this were confirmed, it would entail abandoning the clade Australosphenida.

Most recent phylogenetic studies, lump henosferids and aukstribosphenids alongside monotremes. However in a 2022 review of montreme evolution noted that most primitive monotreme Teinolophos differed substantially from other non-monotreme Australosphenidans, having five molars as opposed to three in all other non-monotreme australosphenidans, and having non-tribosphenic molars, meaning that the two groups were likely unrelated. Later, Flannery and coauthors suggested that the core grouping of australosphenidans (excluding monotremes) were actually stem-therians.

Notes

References
 
 
 

 
Mammal taxonomy